Thomas Maclay Hoyne II (October 12, 1872 – October 1, 1939) was an American politician and lawyer. As a Democrat, from 1912 through 1920, Hoyne served as Cook County State's Attorney. Hoyne also ran as an independent candidate in the 1919 Chicago mayoral election.

Early life
Hoyne was born October 12, 1872. Hoyne was the son of Maclay Hoyne, and the grandson of Thomas Hoyne.

Career
A mentee of Chicago mayor Carter Harrison Jr., Hoyne was tasked in his early political career with overseeing the city's Sixth Ward Democratic Organization. In 1903, after he was elected to a fourth consecutive term as mayor, Harrison appointed Hoyne as the city's Assistant Corporation Counsel. A few years later, Hoyne made an unsuccessful run for county judge. He was later promoted to the First Assistant Corporation Counsel.

In 1908, Hoyne ran for the Democratic nomination for Cook County State's Attorney, supported by the wing of the Carter Harrison Jr.-led wing of the city's Democratic Party. He was up against six other candidates, including William Emmett Dever (supported by the Edward Fitzsimmons Dunne-led wing of the party), and J.J. Kern (supported by the Roger Charles Sullivan-led wing of the party). Kern wound up winning the primary.

In 1912, Hoyne ran again, and was elected Cook County State's Attorney. He was reelected to a second term in 1916. During his tenure, his prosecuting staff procured over 5,000 penitentiary convictions. In his later years as prosecutor, his house was fired upon in assassination attempts. Yet, Hoyne ignored warnings about his safety, and refused the protection of bodyguards.

Hoyne unsuccessfully ran as an independent candidate in the 1919 Chicago mayoral election.

In 1920, Hoyne ran for a third-term as Cook County State's Attorney. However, he lost the Democratic primary to Michael L. Igoe, who went on to be defeated in the general election by Republican Robert E. Crowe.

From 1927 until 1929, Hoyne served as counsel for the Sanitary District of Chicago.

Death
Hoyne died October 1, 1939, in Chicago.

Electoral history

References

District attorneys in Illinois
Illinois Democrats
1872 births
1939 deaths
Politicians from Chicago